Gorenji Podšumberk (in older sources also Gorenji Šumperk) is a small settlement in the Municipality of Trebnje in eastern Slovenia. It lies at the foot of the hill on which Šumberk Castle used to stand (the name Podšumberk means 'below Šumberk' in Slovene). The area is part of the historical Lower Carniola region. The municipality is now included in the Southeast Slovenia Statistical Region.

Name
The name Gorenji Podšumberk means 'upper Podšumberk', differentiating the village from neighboring Dolenji Podšumberk ('lower Podšumberk'), which stands about  lower in elevation. The two villages were attested in historical sources as Gebuuicz in 1424, Gewobicz in 1440, and Jebabicz in 1463, among other spellings.

References

External links

Gorenji Podšumberk at Geopedia

Populated places in the Municipality of Trebnje